The Shared Mobile Atmospheric Research and Teaching Radar, colloquially known as SMART-R or SR, is a mobile Doppler weather radar platform operated and created by University of Oklahoma (OU) with aide from Texas A&M and Texas Tech University in 2001.

Development 
Throughout the early and late 1990s, several mobile radar concepts came to be, often involving high frequency X-band radars which suffer significant attenuation, and often lack in range. Ideally, these radars would serve as research and observation platforms, covering regions scarcely covered by the NEXRAD network as a whole. One such concept later went on to become the Doppler On Wheels, now a fleet of 3 operational vehicles.

In order to counteract the problems previously described with high frequency radars, two decommissioned WSR-74 radars, originally used for local warnings, were acquired by TAMU. These two radars, both operating in the C-band, are less susceptible to attenuation in precipitation and have overall greater ranges for doppler products. Throughout the rest of the 90s and into 2000, development of the first SMART-R, SR-1, began. During development, a fire in the garage housing SR-1 broke out, destroying the truck and several components. Much of the radar survived, however, and the project continued with the completion of SR-1 in late 2001. Following this, SR-2 was assembled and eventually completed in 2004.

Characteristics  
All listed characteristics will apply to both SRs. The operating maximum power for SR is 250 kW. The highest operating frequency for SR is 5,635 MHz - falling into the C-band. With a 2.5 m center-fed parabolic antenna, the gain is approximately 40 dB. Moreover, half power beamwidth is approximately 1.5°.

Deployments 
Since the inception of the project, both SMART-Rs have performed field research in various regions of the United States, including hurricane research, and haboob intensification studies. Both SMART-Rs have sampled tornadic supercells across the plains, taking part in projects such as VORTEX-2 and VORTEX-SE. Given the SR platform consists of two individual radars, projects are often arranged in what is known as a dual-doppler setup, whereas two radars are located at different locations in varying orientations so as to maximize wind retrieval accuracy.

References 

Weather radars